This is a List of bodies of water in the Canadian province of New Brunswick, including waterfalls.

New Brunswick receives precipitation year-round, which feeds numerous streams and rivers. There are two main discharge basins: the Gulf of Saint Lawrence to the east and north and the Bay of Fundy to the south. The major rivers are the Saint John River (Wolastoq) and the Miramichi River.

Bodies of water

See also
List of bays in New Brunswick
List of lakes in New Brunswick
List of mountains in New Brunswick
List of islands of New Brunswick
List of waterfalls in Canada

References

External links

Map of New Brunswick Watershed Groups and Provisional Water Classification

Map of the main rivers of New Brunswick in French

New Brunswick

Bodies of water
New Brunswick